Statistics of Swiss Super League in the 1911–12 season.

East

Table

Central

Table

West

Table

Final

Table

Results 

|colspan="3" style="background-color:#D0D0D0" align=center|19 May 1912

|-
|colspan="3" style="background-color:#D0D0D0" align=center|2 June 1912

|-
|colspan="3" style="background-color:#D0D0D0" align=center|9 June 1912

|}

FC Aarau won the championship.

Sources 
 Switzerland 1911-12 at RSSSF

Seasons in Swiss football
Swiss Football League seasons
1911–12 in Swiss football
Swiss